Super Turrican is the fifth video game in the Turrican series, released for the Super Nintendo Entertainment System in 1993. Super Turrican was also released on the Virtual Console in Europe and Australia on February 29, 2008, and in North America on March 3, 2008.

Gameplay
Super Turrican was developed by Factor 5 and published by Seika. It plays similarly to Mega Turrican (also developed by Factor 5) and shares a similar visual style. The game has a different set of levels, however, and features a freeze beam in place of the original lightning whip. The game only features 4 worlds and ends with the H. R. Giger-inspired alien boss, despite a representation of 'The Machine', similar to that featured in Mega Turrican, appearing in the prologue.

Super Turrican: Director's Cut
A previously unreleased uncut version of the game, titled Super Turrican: Director's Cut, was included with the Analogue Super Nt console. Previously, this uncut version was considered for release on the Wii's Virtual Console, but was rejected by Nintendo due to not being previously released on consoles.

Reception

Super Gamer gave the SNES version an overall review score of 89% summarizing: "You’ve got masses of firepower, but while enemies are numerous, there aren’t as many mega-monsters as there could be."

See also
Super Turrican (NES)
Super Turrican 2

References

External links
 Super Turrican at MobyGames

1993 video games
Run and gun games
Science fiction video games
Seika Corporation games
Side-scrolling video games
Single-player video games
Super Nintendo Entertainment System games
Turrican
Video games developed in Germany
Video games scored by Chris Huelsbeck
Video games set in the 31st century
Virtual Console games
Factor 5 games
Tonkin House games
Hudson Soft games